Eastwood is a suburb in Pretoria, South Africa.

References

Suburbs of Pretoria